Administrative divisions of Lviv, Ukraine, include the formal administrative subdivision into raions (districts) and the more detailed informal subdivision into historical neighborhoods.

Raions of Lviv

Lviv is divided into six raions (districts), each with its own administrative bodies:

 Halych district (ukr. Галицький район – Halytskyi raion)
 Railway district (ukr. Залізничний район – Zaliznychnyi raion)
 Rudne (ukr. селище Рудне - selyshche Rudne)
 Lychakiv district (ukr. Личаківський район – Lychakivskyi raion)
Vynnyky (ukr. місто Винники - misto Vynnyky)
 Sykhiv district (ukr. Сихівський район – Sykhivskyi raion)
 Franko district (ukr. Франківський район – Frankivskyi raion)
 Shevchenko district (ukr. Шевченківський район – Shevchenkivskyi raion)
 Bryukhovychi (ukr. селище Брюховичі - selyshche Bryukhovychi)

External links
 List of city districts. Lviv city official website

History of Lviv